Dinah Chan Siew Kheng (born 24 May 1986) is a Singaporean former road and track cyclist. Chan won the gold medal in the individual time trial at the 2013 South East Asian Games, held in Naypyidaw, Myanmar, ending a 16-year title drought for Singapore. Chan competed for Singapore at the 2010 and 2014 Asian Games in Incheon, South Korea, finishing 4th in the individual time trial in the latter. She also participated at the 2010 UCI Road World Championships and 2011 UCI Road World Championships.

Major results

2009
 1st  Road race, National Road Championships
 3rd  Time trial, Southeast Asian Games
2010
 1st  Road race, National Road Championships
2011
 National Road Championships
1st  Road race
1st  Time trial
 Southeast Asian Games
3rd  Road race
3rd  Time trial
 6th Time trial, Asian Road Championships
2012
 National Road Championships
1st  Road race
1st  Time trial
2013
 1st  Time trial, Southeast Asian Games
 National Road Championships
1st  Road race
1st  Time trial
 8th Time trial, Asian Road Championships
2014
 4th Time trial, Asian Games
2015
 2nd Individual pursuit, Track Clubs ACC Cup
 Southeast Asian Games
3rd  Time trial
7th Road race
 3rd Individual pursuit, Taiwan Hsin-Chu Track International Classic
2016
 National Road Championships
1st  Time trial
2nd Road race
 8th Time trial, Asian Road Championships

References

External links
 

1986 births
Living people
Singaporean female cyclists
Singaporean sportspeople of Chinese descent
Place of birth missing (living people)
Cyclists at the 2010 Asian Games
Cyclists at the 2014 Asian Games
Victoria Junior College alumni
National University of Singapore alumni
Southeast Asian Games medalists in cycling
Southeast Asian Games gold medalists for Singapore
Southeast Asian Games bronze medalists for Singapore
Competitors at the 2011 Southeast Asian Games
Competitors at the 2013 Southeast Asian Games
Competitors at the 2015 Southeast Asian Games
Asian Games competitors for Singapore